Mišši Juhma —( & ) (born April 10, 1936  Săkăt village, Batyrevsky District, Chuvash ASSR, USSR) is a Chuvash novelist, poet, folklorist.

Biography
Mišši Juhma was born on April 10, 1936 in Săkăt in Batyrevsky District in Chuvashia. Mišši Juhma graduated from the Chuvash State Pedagogical University. He as worked as a researcher in Chuvash Republican Museum of Local Lore. He also headed a Chuvash book publishing house.

Creative activity 
Yukhma Mishshi is known as the author of many historical novels and novellas, collections of legends and short stories, essays, dramatic and poetic books; studies on ancient and medieval history, as well as on folklore and mythology of the Chuvash people.

The works of M. Yukhma were published in Russian, Chuvash and other languages of the peoples of the USSR and foreign countries. Yukhma  Mishshi  also works in the genre of drama. About thirty of his plays have been staged on the stages of theaters in a number of countries (Azerbaijan, Lithuania, Ukraine, Kazakhstan, Austria, Korea, etc.), including such as "On the Night of the Full Moon", "Foundation", "Feathers of the White Swan", "Straw Boy", "Dough-Hero", "Husband and Wife — one Satan", "How to Get to Heaven", "Tears of the Gods". Based on his works, operas and ballets were created, which were staged on the stages of a large number of theaters. The words of Mishsha Yukhma are composed of many songs that are sung to this day.

Literature 
 Арустамян Э. С. Михаил Юхма (Миши Юхма) – Всё отдаю людям : Размышления и философские обобщения о жизни и творчестве. – М. : ООО "РиоМакс", 2006. – 319 с.
 "Чӑваш литературин антологийӗ", составители: Д. В. Гордеев, Ю. А. Силэм. Чебоксары, 2003.  .

References

External links
 ЧЭ
 Интервью с Юхма Мишши
 Юхма Мишши (Юхма Михаил Николаевич)
 Михаил Юхма — Книжный Клуб
 Юрă пултăр… хитре (Юхма Мишши)
 ЮХМА МИШШИ (Ильин Михаил Николаевич)

1936 births
Living people
Chuvash writers